Agnaldo Novaes dos Santos (born March 7, 1978), known as Agnaldo, is a Brazilian professional footballer who plays as a midfielder.

Career
Agnaldo used to play for several Brazilian football clubs such as Flamengo, Águia Negra MS, Vilavelhense ES and Vila Nova GO.

Agnaldo moved to China and joined a top tier club Chengdu Blades during the 2009 league season. He played 14 league games, scored 1 goal in 2009 and was released by the club. He signed a contract with Shenyang Dongjin On March 2, 2010.

References

1978 births
Living people
Brazilian footballers
Brazilian expatriate footballers
Expatriate footballers in China
CR Flamengo footballers
Chinese Super League players
China League One players
Chengdu Tiancheng F.C. players
Shenyang Dongjin players
Brazilian expatriate sportspeople in China
Association football forwards
Sportspeople from Salvador, Bahia